Vrh (in older sources Verh per Gumnišči) is a former village in eastern Slovenia in the Municipality of Trebnje. It is now part of the village of Gombišče. It is part of the traditional region of Lower Carniola and is now included in the Southeast Slovenia Statistical Region.

Geography
Vrh lies northwest of the village center of Gombišče, above a karst solution valley and the village of Velike Dole. Vrh Hill rises just east of the houses in the settlement. Šmarnica Creek, which has its source at springs in neighboring Stehanja Vas, flows through the settlement and then to Velike Dole, where it disappears into the ground.

Name
The name Vrh (from the common noun vrh 'peak') is common in Slovenia, referring to the local geography.

History
Vrh was annexed by Gombišče in 1953, ending its existence as a separate settlement.

References

External links
Vrh on Geopedia

Populated places in the Municipality of Trebnje
Former settlements in Slovenia